Nathan Tennyson Adcock (born 22 April 1978) is a lawyer and former professional cricketer who played for the South Australia cricket team, who he captained for part of the 2007–08 season before being replaced with Graham Manou and dropped from South Australia's squad altogether.

Education 
Adcock was educated at St Peter's College, Adelaide where he completed matriculation in 1995. He was invited back to serve as School Captain in 1996.

He commenced a commerce/law degree in 1997 at the University of Adelaide, however his burgeoning first-class cricket career meant it took him a little longer than average to complete the two programs. He graduated from the law school in 2004.

He was admitted to practice law in 2004.

Career

Law 
He commenced working for Hunt & Hunt Lawyers, whilst captaining the Adelaide University first grade side and remaining a member of the Redbacks State squad.

Cricket 
Adcock placed his legal career on hold when on 28 August 2007, he was named as captain of the South Australian cricket team replacing Darren Lehmann who had stepped down. The previous season Adcock only played only four first-class matches however he topped SA's first-class averages with 324 runs at 46.

Midway through the 2007/08 season, he suffered a form slump averaging less than 20 and was replaced as captain by Graham Manou.

Following the end of the 2007/08 season, Adcock was not offered a new contract.

Return to law 
In 2009 he joined law firm Fenwick Elliott Grace with his principal area of practice being construction and engineering.

A commercial lawyer, He later became a partner at Lynch Meyer.

Other 
He was appointed as a board member of the South Australian Cricket Association in May 2014.

References

External links
 

1978 births
Living people
Australian cricketers
South Australia cricketers
People educated at St Peter's College, Adelaide
Cricketers from Adelaide
Ferguslie CC players